Stilbum is a genus of cuckoo wasp (insects in the family Chrysididae).

Species
 Stilbum calens (Fabricius, 1781) 
 Stilbum chrysocephalum Buysson, 1896
 Stilbum cyanurum (Förster, 1771) 
 Stilbum pici  R. du Buysson, 1896
 Stilbum viride Guérin-Méneville, 1842

References 

Hymenoptera genera
Chrysidinae